"Obedezco pero no cumplo" is a phrase that was used in Spanish America throughout much of the colonial period to describe the attitude of local colonial officials towards the rule of the Spanish Crown.

 Don Antonio de Mendoza's (first viceroy of New Spain) reply to the King of Spain when he didn't enact the new laws requested by the king due to the possibility of a rebellion in the silver mines.
 The Marquis de Varinas wrote that the corregidores''' "sole concern is to find means of paying off his large debts and to make a profit from his employment."  This attitude was reflected in the practice of bribery and the maxim "obedezco pero no cumplo".

External links
 Safety now faces new challenges, Houston Business Journal, December 26, 1997.
 Cervantes, Fernando. Old Worlds for New, The Times Literary Supplement, August 2, 2006.
 Diacon, Todd. Moving Up: Is it Really That Tough?, The Chronicle of Higher Education'', May 1, 2007.
 

Latin American history